King Kobra III, released in 1988 on New Renaissance Records, was the first and last album by the Edwards, Michael-Phillips, Northrup, Hart and Appice line-up of King Kobra. After the demise of the original line-up, remaining members Carmine Appice and David Michael-Phillips teamed up with Johnny Edwards, Jeff Northrup and Larry Hart, all 3 members of the Sacramento, CA band Northrup at the time.

The album featured a strong selection of 1980s style mainstream metal. However, a lack of album sales resulted in the dissolution of the band. Bassist Johnny Rod, who appeared on the first two albums as bassist, does not play here. However, he does contribute backing vocals.

The model posing on the album cover is Carmine's then wife, Sarah Appice, who also makes a cameo appearance in the "Take It Off" promotional video.

Track listing
"Mean Street Machine" (David Michael-Phillips, Carmine Appice, Bryson Jones) - 4:26
"Take It Off" (Phillips, Mark Free, Appice) - 3:58
"Walls of Silence" (Jeff Northrup) - 5:23
"Legends Never Die" (Gene Simmons, Micki Free, Adam Mitchell) - 5:04
"Redline" (Phillips, Appice, Jones) - 4:07
"Burning in Her Fire" (Northrup) - 3:33
"Perfect Crime" (Northrup, Johnny Edwards, Glenn Hicks, Larry Hart) - 3:56
"It's My Life" (Simmons, Paul Stanley) - 3:40 
"#1" (Phillips, Appice, Jones) - 5:08

Personnel
Band members
Johnny 'Boy' Edwards – vocals
David Michael-Phillips – lead and rhythm guitars, acoustic and slide guitars, bass, backing vocals, co-producer
Jeff Northrup – lead and rhythm guitars, backing vocals
Larry Hart – bass guitar
Carmine Appice – drums, backing vocals, producer

Additional musicians
Johnny Rod, Steve Sacchi, Mark Olsen, Bryson Jones, Peter Criss, Sarah Appice, Bob Spinella, Dave Flynn - backing vocals

Production
Alex Woltman - engineer, co-producer 
Elliot Solomon - engineer and co-producer on "Take It Off"
Mark Paladino, Duane Baron, Rick Clifford, Angelo Arcuri, Bret Newman - additional engineering

References
Catalogue: (Vinyl) New Renaissance NRR-26; (CD) New Renaissance NRCD-26

King Kobra albums
1988 albums
Albums recorded at Sound City Studios